Jennings Frederick "Sam" "Jenks" Gillem (c. 1890 – November 11, 1951) was an American football player and coach. Gillem played for the Sewanee Tigers of Sewanee: The University of the South, and was selected All-Southern in 1910, 1911, and 1912. His ability punting the football netted him a spot on an Associated Press All-Time Southeast 1869-1919 era team. He served as the head football coach at Howard College—now known as Samford University (1924–1926), Birmingham–Southern College (1928–1939), and Sewanee (1940–1941), compiling a career college football record of 73–65–10. Gillem died on November 11, 1951 at a hospital in Gadsden, Alabama after a long illness. He was 5'9" and 150 pounds.

Head coaching record

References

External links
 

1890 births
1951 deaths
American football drop kickers
American football ends
American football punters
Birmingham–Southern Panthers football coaches
Samford Bulldogs football coaches
Sewanee Tigers football coaches
Sewanee Tigers football players
All-Southern college football players
Sportspeople from Gadsden, Alabama
Players of American football from Alabama
Players of American football from Nashville, Tennessee